Gai Shanxi and her Sisters, directed by Ban Zhongyi, is a 2007 independent Chinese documentary about a Chinese woman's ordeal as a "comfort woman" for the Japanese Army during World War II.

Zhongyi also wrote a related book of the same name.

Plot
Li Dong‘e is a young woman living in a village in Yu County, Shanxi province during the Sino-Japanese War. Because of her beauty she was nicknamed "Gai Shanxi" ("The most beautiful in whole Shanxi Province). In 1941 she and other women from her village are captured by Japanese soldiers. The women are taken to a Japanese stronghold, raped and used as sex slaves.

Gai Shanxi twice rescues other women by offering herself to the Japanese. The continual rapes damage her both physically and mentally. After the war she is shunned by her husband and the villagers and commits suicide.

Festivals
The film was shown at the Amnesty International Film Festival and the Yunnan Multi Culture Visual Festival (YUNFEST).

References

Bibliography

External links
 
 
 

2007 films
Chinese documentary films
Films set in China
2000s Mandarin-language films
Films about comfort women
Documentary films about slavery
2007 documentary films
Prostitution in China
Documentary films about women in World War II
Documentary films about Japanese war crimes